The 2021 Atlantic Coast Conference women's soccer tournament was the 34th edition of the ACC Women's Soccer Tournament, which decided the Atlantic Coast Conference champion. Florida State was the defending champion.

The first round will be played at campus sites, while the semifinals and final will be played at Sahlen's Stadium in Cary, NC.

Florida State successfully defended their title by defeating Wake Forest in the Semifinals and Virginia in the Final.  Clara Robbins of Florida State was named the tournament MVP for the second year in a row.  This was Florida State's eighth ACC Tournament title, and coach Mark Krikorian's eighth title.

As tournament champions, Florida State earned the ACC's automatic berth into the 2021 NCAA Division I Women's Soccer Tournament.

Qualification 

The top six teams in the Atlantic Coast Conference will earn a berth into the ACC Tournament. The top two teams will earn a bye to the semifinals. Wake Forest and North Carolina ended the season tied in the standings with 18 points.  However, Wake Forest won the tiebreaker for the 6th seed, which was determined by the most wins in overall conference games among common opponents.

Bracket

Schedule

First round

Semifinals

Final

Statistics

Goalscorers

All-Tournament team 

MVP in boldSource:

References 

ACC Women's Soccer Tournament
2021 Atlantic Coast Conference women's soccer season